William B. "Farmer" Weaver (March 23, 1865 – January 23, 1943), was a professional baseball player in the Major Leagues from 1888 to 1894, for the Louisville Colonels and Pittsburgh Pirates. Primarily an outfielder (649 games), he also played 73 games at catcher, and 34 games at infield positions.

On August 12, 1890, Weaver hit for the cycle while also getting six hits in one game, a feat that would not be accomplished in the modern era (post-1900) until Ian Kinsler did so for the Texas Rangers on April 15, 2009.

On August 9, 1893, Weaver served as the first base umpire in the second game of a doubleheader between his own Louisville Colonels and the Cleveland Spiders, after the assigned umpire (Thomas Lynch) had become ill; Jack O'Connor of Cleveland served as the home plate umpire.

After his baseball career ended, Weaver worked for the Goodyear Tire and Rubber Company.


See also
 List of Major League Baseball career stolen bases leaders
 List of Major League Baseball single-game hits leaders
 List of Major League Baseball players to hit for the cycle

References

Further reading

External links
, or Retrosheet

1865 births
1943 deaths
American expatriate baseball players in Canada
Louisville Colonels players
Pittsburgh Pirates players
Major League Baseball outfielders
Baseball players from West Virginia
Sportspeople from Parkersburg, West Virginia
19th-century baseball players
Minor league baseball managers
Topeka Capitals players
Wichita Braves players
San Antonio Missionaries players
Milwaukee Brewers (minor league) players
Milwaukee Creams players
Terre Haute Hottentots players
Cleveland Lake Shores players
Syracuse Stars (minor league baseball) players
Denver Grizzlies (baseball) players
Salt Lake City (minor league baseball) players
Lagoon (minor league baseball) players
Butte Miners players
San Francisco Pirates players
Portland Green Gages players
Salt Lake City Elders players
Boise Fruit Pickers players
Vancouver Veterans players
Strong City-Cottonwood Falls Twins City players
Larned Cowboys players
Larned Wheat Kings players
Great Bend Millers players
Lyons Lions players